Robyn Olivia Wilkins (born 1 April 1995) is a Welsh rugby union player who has played either centre, fly-half or full-back for the Wales women's national rugby union team and Exeter Chiefs of the Premier 15s.

She made her debut for the Wales national squad in 2014 and has played over 50 matches for the national side. Wilkins has played for Ospreys, Cardiff Blues Women and Llandaff North RFC at the club level. She works as a science teacher at Bassaleg Comprehensive School in Newport while continuing her rugby career.

Personal life and education
On 1 April 1995, Wilkins was born in Bridgend in Wales. She is the daughter of the Welsh former one-time international rugby fly-half Gwilyn Wilkins. Wilkins plays either as centre, fly-half or full-back in rugby union. Wilkins was educated at Porthcawl Comprehensive School from 2006 to 2013 and later matriculated to Cardiff University to study a Bachelor of Science degree in Biomedical Science between 2013 and 2016. She teaches science at Bassaleg Comprehensive School in Newport while continuing her rugby career. Wilkins formerly ventured between hospitals in Birmingham and Wales selling radioactive substances to nuclear medicine department in her role working as an account manager for a medical imaging company.

Early career 
She began playing rugby around the age of seven or eight while in primary school and at Pyle RFC, having observed her father participate in the sport. Wilkins at first played alongside boys but was segregated approaching adolescence as is common in team sports. Following time away from rugby between the ages of 11 and 15, she learnt Pencoed had a rugby team and played in its Under 18s side at schools before moving to the Ospreys Under 18s squad. Wilkins learnt Wales had a women's rugby union team when she was around 15 or 16. She played as part of the Girls Under 18 Dragons "A" winning team in the 2013 UK Student Games at Abbeydale Sports Ground in Sheffield.

International career 
In 2014, Wilkins was called up to the Wales women's national rugby union team, making her international debut against Italy in the first match of the 2014 Women's Six Nations Championship, scoring two penalties. A gain of weight and decrease in fitness as a result of low confidence and motivation affected her performance throughout 2015 but an increase in training reversed all that the following year due to help she received from the WRU's conditioning and strength coach. Wilkins has played for the Wales national team 50 times since her debut in 2014, having reached the 50 cap milestone against Ireland at the 2021 Women's Six Nations Championship. She played 33 Women's Six Nations matches, scoring two tries and 77 points. Wilkins competed for Wales at the 2014 Women's Rugby World Cup and the 2017 Women's Rugby World Cup. She has also played for the Wales women's national rugby sevens team.

Wilkins was selected in Wales squad for the 2021 Rugby World Cup in New Zealand.

Club career 
At the club level, she has played for Ospreys, Cardiff Blues Women and Llandaff North RFC. Wilkins has been a team member of Worcester Warriors Women of Premier 15s since August 2020 after signing a contract to play for the side having impressed lead coach Sian Moore. She also plays for Gloucester-Hartpury Women. She is a member of Wales' Sisters in Arms programme and helps students at Bassaleg Comprehensive School the chance to build a team in the Urdd WRU sevens competition. Wilkins has worked for Cardiff Blues' Unstoppables women's campaign since the beginning of the 2020–21 season. She signed for Exeter Chiefs women ahead of the 2022-23 Premier 15s season.

References

1995 births
Living people
Rugby union players from Bridgend
Alumni of Cardiff University
20th-century Welsh women
21st-century Welsh women
Welsh female rugby union players
Wales international rugby union players
Female rugby sevens players
Rugby union centres
Rugby union fly-halves
Rugby union fullbacks
Welsh schoolteachers